The 6th Kisei was the 6th edition of the Kisei tournament. Since Fujisawa Hideyuki won the previous year, he is given an automatic place in the final. Eight players battled in a knockout tournament to decide the final 2. Those two would then play each other in a best-of-3 match to decide who would face Fujisawa. Rin Kaiho became the challenger after beating Kobayashi Koichi 2 games to 0, but would lose 4 games to 3 against Fujisawa.

Main tournament

Challenger finals

Finals

References 

Kisei (Go)
1982 in go